Bobby Wayne Gray (born April 30, 1978) is a former safety in the National Football League. He was drafted in the fifth round of the 2002 NFL Draft. He played for the Chicago Bears from 2002 to 2004. He played college football at Louisiana Tech and high school football at Aldine High School in Houston, Texas.

1978 births
Living people
Players of American football from Houston
American football safeties
Louisiana Tech Bulldogs football players
Chicago Bears players